Stephen Henry Wildstrom (July 11, 1947 – November 24, 2015) was an American technology columnist and a technology consultant.

Personal life
Born in Detroit, Michigan, Wildstrom went to University of Michigan. He died on November 24, 2015, from brain cancer.

Career
He was a technology columnist for Business Week, where his column was called as Technology and You. Steve Wildstrom joined Business Week in 1972. He served in variety of capacities, covering politics, economics, and labor in Washington and Detroit and was also deeply involved in the computerization of editorial operations in the 1980s.

After leaving the magazine following its purchase by Bloomberg he became a freelance journalist, writing for sites such as Techpinions. He suffered a brain tumor.

Awards
 McGraw-Hill Achievement Award

References

External links
 Official site

American columnists
American technology writers
American male journalists
Journalists from Michigan
Deaths from brain cancer in the United States
1947 births
2015 deaths
Writers from Detroit
University of Michigan alumni